"When Did You Stop Loving Me, When Did I Stop Loving You" is a 1978 song recorded by singer Marvin Gaye. Taken from his Here, My Dear album, it was written following his 1976 divorce when he was ordered to give half the takings of his next album to ex-wife Anna Gaye. In the album, he "poured his emotions into songs agonisingly documenting their relationship's rise and fall."

The song was a six-minute-long opus that has been considered the centerpiece of the Here, My Dear album. As if offering confessional testimony to his wife, Gaye airs his side of the story of how his ill-fated marriage to the sister of his record label boss Berry Gordy collapsed. 

In a spoken narrative, the singer accuses Anna in the beginning of not following their marriage vows, saying that lying about being faithful was similar to "lying to God". He then blames himself as well for the death of the marriage, stating: "I tried but all of (our) promises (were) nothing but lies" and then promises himself if he finds someone else (his new wife Janis), he will try a new way.

But no matter how optimistic he seemed, he always reflected back on his marriage to Anna and how at one point, she called the cops on him for a domestic dispute. The title is not spoken until the final verse, when Marvin croons in his trademark falsetto about where did the love go in their relationship.

Written and produced solely by the artist himself, the song was unusual for having no distinct melody, no bridge and no distinct chorus and for its length. However, it did have near melodic consistencies, such as "Memories of the things we did/Some we're proud of, some we hid".."If you loved me with all of your heart/You'd never take a million dollars to part". He would use the instrumental of this song as both an instrumental track (with several Gaye ad-libs) and as the reprise of the album to end it.

The song served as the template for Daryl Hall's song "Stop Loving Me, Stop Loving You," from his 1993 solo album, Soul Alone. After being played the song by a friend and thinking it was an unreleased bootleg, Hall reworked the tune as a standard-structured R&B/pop song. The song also featured as the in-game radio playlist on Blonded Los Santos 97.8 FM from the enhanced version of Grand Theft Auto V.

Personnel
All vocals, keyboards and synthesizers by Marvin Gaye
Drums by Bugsy Wilcox
Guitars by Wali Ali
Guitar by Gordon Banks
Bass by Frank Blair
Trumpet by Nolan Smith
Tenor saxophone by Charles Owens

References

1978 songs
Marvin Gaye songs
Songs written by Marvin Gaye
Song recordings produced by Marvin Gaye
Songs about marriage
Songs about divorce